Lennox Joseph Cush (born 12 December 1974) in Georgetown, Guyana is a West Indies cricketer who played for Guyana in Stanford 2020. However, he has also represented U.S.A. in cricket and has been named in national squad for World Cricket League Division Four.

Career
Cush is an all-rounder who has played in 38 first class matches for Guyana and scored 1249 runs at an average of 20.81 and took 26 wickets. He is a right-handed middle order batsman and a right arm off-break bowler. 
He made his debut for U.S.A during 2006 ICC Americas Championship. His all-round performance against Argentina won him Man of the Match award, he scored 73 runs and took 2 wickets for 30 runs.

During the 2010 Caribbean Twenty20 season, Cush was the leading wicket taker, taking 11 wickets at an average of 12.45 and a strike rate of 8.1.

References

1974 births
Living people
Sportspeople from Georgetown, Guyana
Guyanese cricketers
American cricketers
Guyana cricketers
Guyanese emigrants to the United States